The Journal of Mechanics of Materials and Structures is a peer-reviewed scientific journal covering research on the mechanics of materials and deformable structures of all types. It was established by Charles R. Steele, who was also the first editor-in-chief.

History
The journal was established in 2006 after 21 of the 23 members of the editorial board of the International Journal of Solids and Structures resigned in protest of Elsevier's "pressure for increased profits out of the limited institutional resources." In their founding issue, the editors of the new journal indicated several desires for the publication, including, "a low subscription price that will not grow faster than the number of pages and indeed may drop as the subscriber base expands."

Abstracting and indexing
The journal is abstracted and indexed in Current Contents/Engineering, Computing & Technology, Ei Compendex, Science Citation Index Expanded, and Scopus. According to the Journal Citation Reports, the journal has a 2020 impact factor of 0.987.

References

External links

Materials science journals
English-language journals
Publications established in 2006
Mathematical Sciences Publishers academic journals
5 times per year journals